David Franks may refer to:

 David Franks (aide-de-camp) (1740–1793), aide-de-camp for General Benedict Arnold during the American War of Independence
 David Franks (loyalist) (1720–1794), loyalist in the war of the American Revolution
 David Franks (hurler) (born 1979), Irish hurler

See also
David Frank (disambiguation)